Rodolphe Alexandre (born 26 September 1953 in Cayenne) is a French politician from French Guiana. The former Mayor of Cayenne, he was president of the Guiana Assembly, the deliberative assembly of French Guiana, since its
establishment on 1 January 2016, until 2021.

He was president of the Regional Council of French Guiana from 26 March 2010, till the Regional Council and General Council
were replaced by the one body, the Guiana Assembly, on 1 January 2016.

Having completed his secondary education at Felix Eboue High School, he obtained a Master of history and geography at the University of Bordeaux III.

He joined the Guianese Socialist Party (PSG) in 1983, when he became chief of staff in the General Council of Guyana (until 1988).

References

1953 births
Living people
Presidents of the Assembly of French Guiana
Members of the Assembly of French Guiana
Presidents of the Regional Council of French Guiana
Mayors of Cayenne
French Guianan politicians
Mayors of places in French Guiana
People from Cayenne